Warlick–Huffman Farm, also known as the Solomon Warlick House, is a historic farm and national historic district located near Propst Crossroads, Catawba County, North Carolina. The district encompasses 7 contributing buildings, 1 contributing site and 7 contributing structures. The house was built about 1820, and is a two-story, vernacular Federal style frame farmhouse.  Also on the property are the contributing Kitchen (c. 1820), outhouse, woodshed, six chicken coops, corn crib, and tackhouse / granary.

It was added to the National Register of Historic Places in 1990.

References

Farms on the National Register of Historic Places in North Carolina
Historic districts on the National Register of Historic Places in North Carolina
Federal architecture in North Carolina
Houses completed in 1820
Houses in Catawba County, North Carolina
National Register of Historic Places in Catawba County, North Carolina